

Curt Gallenkamp (17 February 1890 – 13 April 1958) was a German general (General of the Artillery) in the Wehrmacht during World War II and a convicted war criminal. He was a recipient of the Knight's Cross of the Iron Cross of Nazi Germany.

Gallenkamp surrendered to the British troops in May 1945. He was tried for war crimes for the deaths of British paratroops/commandos and an American pilot. He was sentenced to be hanged in 1947, but had his sentence commuted to life imprisonment and was released in 1952.

Awards

 Knight's Cross of the Iron Cross on 19 November 1941 as Generalleutnant and commander of 78. Infanterie-Division

Notes

References

 
 

1890 births
1958 deaths
People from Wesel
German Army generals of World War II
Generals of Artillery (Wehrmacht)
German Army personnel of World War I
Recipients of the clasp to the Iron Cross, 1st class
Recipients of the Knight's Cross of the Iron Cross
German prisoners of war in World War II held by the United Kingdom
Nazis convicted of war crimes
People from the Rhine Province
Reichswehr personnel
Military personnel from North Rhine-Westphalia
Prisoners sentenced to death by the British military